Jeremy Geddes is a photo-realistic painter from Wellington, New Zealand. He is widely known for the Cosmonaut series of paintings,  and has illustrated for comic book covers, in collaboration with friend Ashley Wood. Geddes won the Spectrum Gold Award for his cover art for the comic, Doomed.  His children's picture book, The Mystery of Eilean Mor, was shortlisted for The Aurealis Awards, won the Crichton Award, and was named as one of CBC Notable Books in 2006.

Geddes is also a gaming enthusiast.

References 

Living people
Australian painters
Australian children's book illustrators
Year of birth missing (living people)